Kasla was a Palestinian  village in the Jerusalem Subdistrict.  It was depopulated during the 1948 Arab–Israeli War on July 17, 1948, by the Harel Brigade of Operation Dani. It was located 17 km west of Jerusalem.

History

Antiquity 

Kasla has been  identified with the ancient Canaanite settlement of Chesalon, and is believed to preserve its ancient name. Chesalon is mentioned in the Book of Joshua as one of the landmarks on the boundary of Tribe of Judah. During the Roman period, Chesalon was a Jewish settlement; it was mentioned in a document found in Wadi Murabba'at and dated to the first-century CE. Remains from the Roman era has been found in a cave by the village. It is unknown whether it continued to exist in the aftermath of the First Jewish-Roman War and the Bar Kohkva Revolt.

Ancient ashlar stones have been found at Kasla, and the village had several khirbas, including a shrine for a local sage known as al-Shaykh Ahmad.

Ottoman era
Kasla was incorporated into the Ottoman Empire in 1517 with all of Palestine, and in 1596 it appeared in the tax registers under the name of Kisli, or Kisla, as being in the  nahiya ("subdistrict") of Ramla, which was under the administration of Gaza Sanjak. It had a population of 11 household; an estimated 61 persons, who were all Muslims. They paid a fixed tax-rate of 25% on agricultural products, including wheat, barley,  summer crops,  fruit trees, sesame, goats and beehives, in addition to occasional revenues; a total of 1,280 akçe. All of the revenue went to a waqf.

In 1838, Kesla was noted as a Muslim village in the  el-Arkub district, southwest of Jerusalem.

In 1863 Victor Guérin described it a being situated on a ridge,  while an Ottoman village list of about 1870 showed Kesla with a population of 83, in 29 houses,  though the population count included men only. It was also noted that to was located 3 1/2 to 4 hours west of Jerusalem.

In 1883, the PEF's Survey of Western Palestine described Kesla as "a small stone village in a conspicuous position on the top of a rugged ridge, with a deep valley to the north. There is a spring to the east, and two more in a valley to the south. This is the site of Chesalon."

In 1896 the population of Kesla was estimated to be about 207 persons.

British Mandate era
In the 1922 census of Palestine conducted by the British Mandate authorities,  Kasala  had a population of 233 Muslims, increasing in the 1931 census to 299 Muslims, in 72 houses.

In the 1945 statistics, the village had a population of 280 Muslims,  while the total land area was 8,004 dunams, according to an official land and population survey.  Of this,  440 were used for plantations and irrigable land,  2,265 for cereals, while 10 dunams were classified as built-up areas.

1948, and aftermath

Kasla, along with four other villages, were overtaken by the Israeli Harel Brigade on 17–18 July 1948 in Operation Dani. The villages had been on the front line since April 1948 and most of the inhabitants of these villages had already left the area. Many of those who stayed fled when Israeli forces attacked and the few who remained at each village were expelled.

Israel established two moshavs on Kasla's land: in 1948, Ramat Raziel; while in  1952  Ksalon was founded 1 km south of the village site, on the archeological site named Khirbat Sa'ra.

In 1992 the village site was described: "Wild grass covers the entire site and grows amid the rubble of the stone houses, which is difficult to distinguish from the rubble of ruined terraces. Almond trees grow on top of the mountain and cactuses grow along the site’s southern slopes. Northeast of the village, two carob trees are surrounded by the remains of a vineyards. On the slopes, thick wild grass grows on several terraces, which are still intact."

References

Bibliography

External links
Welcome To Kasla
Kasla,   Zochrot 
Survey of Western Palestine, Map 17:   IAA, Wikimedia commons 
Kasla, from the Khalil Sakakini Cultural Center

Arab villages depopulated during the 1948 Arab–Israeli War
District of Jerusalem